Fujitsu manufactures two series of image scanners: ScanSnap for consumers/SOHO, and fi for business (fi includes SP brand). Popular ScanSnap models include the S1300, a feature-rich scanner that can scan double-sided color originals, and the S1100, one of the world's smallest scanners. By September 2018, ScanSnap had sold more than five million units globally since 2001, and the ScanSnap brand reaches the age of twenty years on July 10, 2021.

The following is a selection of scanners manufactured under the Fujitsu brand.

Current models

Previous models 

 ScanSnap S300 – portable scanner, 10 sheet ADF, 600 dpi optical resolution, 8 to 0.5 pages per minute depending on mode and AC availability 
 ScanSnap S300M – Macintosh version of S300 with similar specifications
 ScanSnap S500
 ScanSnap S500M
 ScanSnap S510
 ScanSnap S510M
 ScanSnap S1100
 ScanSnap S1300 
 ScanSnap S1500 
 ScanSnap S1500M
 ScanSnap iX500 Deluxe

Other
 SP-1425

References

Fujitsu lists
Fujitsu image scanners